Bryony Simpson   is a speech and language therapist

Career
Simpson qualified in 1979 and initially worked in adult rehabilitation services at Northwick Park Hospital, London. She moved to Grimsby in 1980 and worked across services in North Lincolnshire and Hull. Simpson was the chair of the Royal College of Speech and Language Therapists between 2012 and 2014.

On 20 July 2015 she was awarded an honorary doctorate from Leeds Beckett University. Simpson was awarded an MBE for services to speech and language in the 2015 New Year Honours.

Simpson retired in 2016.

References

Living people
British women academics
Speech and language pathologists
Year of birth missing (living people)
Fellows of the Royal College of Speech and Language Therapists